Football Club Minerva Lintgen is a football club, based in Lintgen, in central Luxembourg.

External links
FC Minerva Lintgen official website

Football clubs in Luxembourg
1910 establishments in Luxembourg
Association football clubs established in 1910